Mull may refer to:

Places
Isle of Mull, a Scottish island in the Inner Hebrides
Sound of Mull, between the Isle of Mull and the rest of Scotland
Mount Mull, Antarctica
Mull Hill, Isle of Man
Mull, Arkansas, a place along Arkansas Highway 14
Mull, Indiana, a community in the United States
Mull of Galloway, a promontory in  Wigtownshire, and the southernmost point in Scotland
Mull of Kintyre, the southwesternmost tip of the Kintyre Peninsula in Scotland

Other uses
Mull (geographical term), a hill or promontory
Mull (surname)
Mull (film), a 1989 Australian film featuring Nadine Garner
Chicken mull, a traditional American dish from Carolina and Georgia
Mulling (spectroscopy), a technique of preparing a solid for infrared spectroscopy
Mull, a character in Atelier Iris: Eternal Mana
Mull, the gauze used in bookbinding

See also
Empire Mull, ship
Mul (disambiguation)
Mull 34, sailing yacht
Mull Covered Bridge, near Burgoon, Ohio, on the National Register of Historic Places
Mull House and Cemetery, New York, on the National Register of Historic Places
Mulled wine, heated and spiced wine